The  are botanical gardens located in Takaoka, Toyama, Japan.

The garden site occupies about 10,000 m², and contains both wildflowers and many plant varieties mentioned in the Man'yōshū anthology.

References 
 Takaoka Lifelong Learning Park

Botanical gardens in Japan
Gardens in Toyama Prefecture